Hershberg is a surname. Notable people with the surname include:

Israel Hershberg (born 1948), Israeli painter
James Hershberg (born 1960), American academic